Lehlogonolo Masalesa (born 21 March 1992 in Mankweng) is a South African footballer who last played for Black Leopards as a midfielder.

Career
Masalesa started his top-flight career at Platinum Stars after coming through the Africa Sport Youth Development Academy. However, he only made one substitute appearance for Dikwena, prompting a move to Bidvest Wits, who he represented 28 times before signing a three-year deal with Orlando Pirates in September 2012. The ex-national Under-20 midfielder notably impressed when given game-time during Pirates' run to the CAF Champions League Final in 2013.

He was given the nickname "Vieira" by famous South African football commentator Baba Mthethwa due to the similarities he shares with the former French international footballer.

References

1992 births
Living people
Sportspeople from Limpopo
People from Polokwane Local Municipality
South African soccer players
South Africa international soccer players
Orlando Pirates F.C. players
Bidvest Wits F.C. players
Platinum Stars F.C. players
Black Leopards F.C. players
Chippa United F.C. players
Athlitiki Enosi Larissa F.C. players
South African expatriate soccer players
Expatriate footballers in Greece
South African expatriate sportspeople in Greece
African Games silver medalists for South Africa
African Games medalists in football
Association football midfielders
Competitors at the 2011 All-Africa Games